The Dandelion Sessions is the second album recorded by pop singer Aslyn, following her 4-disc set The Grand Garden EP released in 2008. It was originally titled Wherever the Dandelion Falls but was changed as the new title reflected the album better as a whole.

Track listing
All songs by Aslyn and Jeremy Mitchell.

 "Brokenhearted Day"
 "Me & You & Daisies"
 "Wherever the Dandelion Falls"
 "What is the Difference"
 "Trying to Drive" (Featuring Zac Brown)
 "Making Her Right"
 "Riding the Brakes"
 "The Way It Goes"
 "In & Out"
 "Your Best Thing"
 "Nadine"
 "Growing Out Of You"
 "Can't Get There From Here" (Parking Lot Song - Part 2)

References
Official track listing and album information from Aslyn's site

Aslyn albums
2009 albums